What's Eating You is an American reality documentary series about people with eating disorders. The series premiered on October 13, 2010, on the E! cable network.

Production 

The reality documentary series was announced in April 2010. The six-part television series features people who have compulsive eating disorders; each episode introduces two people whose lives are threatened by harmful eating habits and features doctors trying to help them to overcome the disorders.

JD Roth, one of the producers of the series, said, "One might assume that a show about severe eating disorders would focus solely on participants' bizarre behavior around food; but this show really is about the incredible fortitude and strength of people with intense obstacles to overcome [...]. We're very proud to be working with E! [...] in offering hope and a path to recovery."

Episodes

References

External links 

 
 

2010 American television series debuts
2010 American television series endings
English-language television shows
E! original programming
Television shows about eating disorders